The Corps of Electronics and Mechanical Engineers (EME) is an arms and service branch of the Indian Army. The Corps has varying responsibilities related to the design, development, trial, inspection and refit of weapon systems and equipment. They also provide technical advice to units and conduct recovery operations in peace and war.

History
The British Army formed the Corps of Royal Electrical and Mechanical Engineers (REME) on 1 October 1942, in order to put the responsibilities of repairing and maintaining all British Army equipment under one unit. Previously, this was done by different corps like the Royal Army Ordnance Corps, the Corps of Royal Engineers and the Royal Army Service Corps. Soon, the need for an equivalent of the REME was felt in British Indian Army too. Accordingly, the Commander-in-Chief of British forces approved the raising of the Indian Electrical and Mechanical Engineers (IEME). On 1 May 1943, the Mechanical Engineering Directorate at General Headquarters was formed and units were allocated. On 15 October 1943, actual transfer of personnel from the Indian Army Ordnance Corps (IAOC) to IEME took place. Since then, 15 October is observed as EME Corps day. On 15 September 1944, Lt. Gen. Sir Clarence Bird was appointed as the Colonel Commandant of IEME. After Indian independence, the corps dropped the 'I' from its name and came to be known as the Corps of Electrical and Mechanical Engineers (EME). With the proliferation of high technology, the modernisation of the Indian Army in the 1980s and 1990s resulted in use of electronics in all types of equipment which necessitated the corps to change its outlook from electrical to electronics. Thus, the corps was re-christened as the "Corps of Electronics and Mechanical Engineers" on 1 January 2001. The Corps of EME also has a cadre of Gp 'A' Gazetted Civilian Technical Officers  who are recruited through coveted Indian Engineering Services Examination (IES) conducted by Union Public Services Commission (UPSC). The civilian officers are mostly posted to Army Base Workshops, EME Directorate and training establishments such as MCEME, Secunderabad and EME School, Baroda.

Crest
The crest of IEME was designed by Major General DR Duguid, the first DME and remained in vogue from 1943 to 1955. It was in bronzed brass with fine-pointed `Star of India’ surmounted by a crown and encircled by a thick wreath of laurels. I.E.M.E. were embossed on the base of the wreath. The Corps motto `Omnia Facimus’ meaning ‘We can do everything’ was inscribed.

The present badge was designed by Major SE Doig and was taken into use from 26 Jan 1955. In 1967 the size of the crest was reduced to two-thirds of the original size. The badge is bi-metallic with the horse, chain and globe in white metal and the rest in gilt. The horse chained to the globe symbolises harnessed mechanical power with the lightning flashes depicting electrical energy. The globe is indicative of the impact of engineering on the world. On the top of Crest is the National Emblem of India and the Corp's motto inscribed Karm Hi Dharm in Devanagri Script.

Motto
Omnia Facimus (in Latin), which translates to 'We can do everything', was the Corps motto used during the formative years of Corps. After the IEME was transformed into the EME, a new Corps motto was selected which should be in line with the Indian ethos. To reflect the work culture amongst the craftsmen, the motto `Karm Hi Dharm’ was selected. Translated into English the motto is, `Work is Supreme Duty’.

Flag

Oxford Blue :  Signifies devotion to duty.
 
Golden Yellow :  Represents magnanimity and intellect.

Scarlet : Implies aggressiveness valour and sacrifice.

Regimental colours

The Colours stand for everything that the Corps is. They speak of honour, of deeds, of dedication and of the service rendered by the personnel of the Corps. They are the symbol of the spirit of the Corps and are sacred to the soldier.

The design for the Corps colours was proposed by the then DEME, Major General SP Vohra, and approved by the then President Dr S Radhakrishnan, in March 1964.

The EME colours is a golden yellow silken flag, 3 feet by 3 feet 9 inches ; the Corps badge is embroidered on a blue circular piece and placed in the centre with a single wreath of Ashoka leaves and lotus flowers embroidered around it. On a scroll beneath the wreath is embroidered the name ‘Corps of Electrical and Mechanical Engineers’. The name of Ashoka signifies peace and the leaves represent happiness and prosperity. The lotus is a symbol of peace, tranquility, beauty and richness.

The President of India, Dr S Radhakrishnan, presented the Colours to the Corps on 15 Oct 1964 at 1 EME Centre Secunderabad during the 21st Anniversary celebrations. The Colour party consisted of Lieutent RP Nanda, Havildar Major Dev Raj and Naik Bashisht. It was the first amongst the Services to receive Regimental Colours, an honour bestowed to acknowledge the contribution made by this young Corps. The Second Colours Presentation was presented at 3 EME Centre Bhopal on 15 October 1980. The Colours presented on behalf of the President by the General OP Malhotra, PVSM, COAS.  After a gap of 24 years, the Third Colours presentation was presented on 23 Nov 2004 and for the first time after rechristening the corps as Corps of Electronicsand Mechanical Engineers. The old colours were put to rest and new colours were presented to the Corps at 1 EME Centre, Secunderabad by the Gen NC Vij, PVSM, UYSM, COAS on behalf of the President during Diamond Jubilee Celebration and Eighth Corps Reunion on 23 Nov 2004, at 1 EME Centre, Secunderabad.  The high order of dedication of the Corps was again recognised when the Corps was once more honoured with colours on 18 Feb 2005. On behalf of the President of India, Gen JJ Singh, PVSM, AVSM, VSM, ADC, COAS presented the Fourth Colours Presentation at 3 EME Centre Bhopal.

Awards and honours
Despite not a frontline combat force, The Corps has been awarded various gallantry awards along with national awards and honours.

Ashoka Chakra
HAV JAGDISH LAL 1958
JEM KISHAN LAL 1964

Kirti Chakra
JEM A SOMAIAH  - 1955
JEM JAIKARAN SINGH  - 1957
BRIG ML GARG  - 1986
HAV PREMNATH RAI (Posthumous)  - 1989
LT M NARENDRA ATMARAM (Posthumous)  - 2001
MAJ DEEPAK TEWARI  - 2009

Vir Chakra
JEM JIT SINGH 1947
CAPT MV SOORAJ 1999

Shaurya Chakra
CFN DC DAS 1971
NK RAM KUMAR SINGH 1986
L/NK S GHOSH 1988
CAPT CM THIMANNA 1993
CAPT S MUKUND M
NK RK SINGH
MAJ Vibhuti Shankar Dhoundiyal 2019

Arjuna Award

SUB SARVJIT SINGH  - 1962
SUB TARLOK SINGH  - 1962
CHM BS BARUAH - 1966
MAJ HPS AHLUWALIA - 1971
BRIG RK MANCHANDA  - 1980
SUB MAJ JENIL KRISHNAN  - 2005
NB SUB MILKHA SINGH  - 2007
SUB MAJ (HONY LT) RAJESH CHOUDHARY, VSM)  - 2010
 SUB MAJ ( HONY CAPT) SAJI THOMAS 2014

Sena Medal

Showing awardees after 2005
LT ASHUTOSH KANWAR  - 2005
LT RAHUL RAMESH PAWAR  - 2005
MAJ DEVENDER SINGH ROHILLA  - 2006
MAJ VIMAL SHARMA  - 2006
MAJ VIKRAM DAHIYA  - 2007
CAPT RAJ SINGH DUHAN   - 2007
CAPT RAJEEV CHAUDHARY - 2007
LT HRISHIKESH SANJAY PURANIK  - 2008
CAPT MANISH SOBTI  - 2009
CAPT AVEG GOEL  - 2009
CAPT PREMNATH OTHAYOTH  - 2009
LT NALLASIVAM RAVI KUMAR  - 2009
CAPT CHETAN SHARMA  - 2010
LT BHOSALE ADITYA SHIVAJIRAO  - 2010
LT ASHISH NEGI  - 2010
MAJ RANJEET SINGH  - 2011
MAJ AJAY KANDPAL  - 2012
LT MOHIT JATAIN  - 2013
CAPT ANKUR TYAGI - 2015
 CAPT KULWINDER SINGH
 CAPT AKHIL RADHAKRISHNAN - 2020
 CAPT RAHUL SHARMA -2020
Padma Bhushan
COL SATYA PAL WAHI 1988
MAJ HPS AHLUWALIA (RETD) 2002

Padma Shri
JEM MILKHA SINGH 1959
MAJ HPS AHLUWALIA 1965
MAJ GEN SN BHASKAR 1985
COL DARSHAN SINGH VOHRA 1988
CFN MURLIKANT PETKAR 2018

Sports and research

The Corps of EME has always been carrying the lead baton in the field of adventure sports in Indian Army. Over the years soldier craftsmen have earned laurels in every field of adventure sports. Corps Of EME has given tremendous impetus to activities like mountaineering, Sailing, Sky-diving, hot-air ballooning, para-sailing, hang-gliding, skiing, rafting, canoeing and exploration in the Antarctica to name a few.

Padma Shri awardee Milkha Singh, also known as Flying Sikh represented India in three Summer Olympic Games and won athletics gold medal at 1958 British Empire and Commonwealth Games. He also won gold medals in the 1958 and 1962 Asian Games and set many national records which stood for a long time. Major HPS Ahluwaliais an Indian mountaineer from Corps of EME who scaled Mount Everest on 29 May 1965 along with his friends Rawat, Phu Dorji and Edmund Hillary. He is decorated with the Padma Bhushan, Padma Shri and also the Arjuna Award.

Murlikant Petkar is India's first Paralympic gold medalist. He won an individual gold medal in the 1972 Summer Paralympics, in Heidelberg, Germany. He set a world record in the 50 m freestyle swimming event, at 37.33 seconds. In the same games he participated in javelin, precision javelin throw and slalom[contradictory]. He was a finalist in all three events.In 2018, he was awarded with the Padma Shri.

EME has been actively participating in various Antarctica expeditions since 1983-84. It has been awarded four Sena Medals, two Vishist Seva Medals and five Chief of Army Commendation Cards. On 17 Jan 1989 JK Bajaj reached the bottom of the earth, the geographical South Pole, after covering 1250 km across the Antarctica in 50 days with an Internationals team. He is the first and only Indian and Asian to set foot on the South Pole and has been elected a fellow of the Royal Geographical Society, UK and The Explorers Club, USA to honour his achievement.

The Corps has been contributing sports persons for the national teams like sailing, rowing, hockey, wrestling and weightlifting. In the Common Wealth Games-2010 Hav Valluri Srinivasa Rao won Bronze medal in weightlifting in 56 kg category and Hav Sunil Kumar was won Bronze medal in wrestling in 66 kg Greco-Roman category. Hav Jagdeesha KK of Corps Kabaddi Team won Gold Medal at 14th Asian Games, Busan.Valluri Srinivas Rao also bagged Silver Medal for the National team in the Afro-Asian Games. Sep V Biju of EME Corps Weight Lifting team represented India in Commonwealth Championship on Weight Lifting held at Malta, Italy wef 22 Jun 04 in 62 kg wt category and won a silver medal.

The EME team continues to maintain the lifeline of the Maitri permanent research station in the difficult and hazardous environment of Antarctica.

Monuments
The Corps has six Monuments, which have found a place of pride in the Tourism Map of the country.

The War Memorial, Secunderabad
EME War Memorial Bhopal
EME Archives and Museum
Dakshina Murthy Temple, Vadodara
Guruvayurappan Temple, Secunderabad
The EME Gurudwara

References

Indian Army Corps of Engineers

Military of India